Henry Dutton may refer to:
 Henry Dutton (politician) (1796–1869), American politician, governor of Connecticut
 Henry Dutton (pastoralist) (1844–1914), pastoralist in South Australia
 Henry Hampden Dutton (1879–1932), his son, South Australian pastoralist
 Henry Dutton (cricketer) (1847–1935), English cricketer
 Harry Dutton (footballer) (1898–1972), English footballer